Braude Academic College of Engineering is a college in the city of Karmiel, Israel.

History
ORT Braude college was established in Karmiel in 1985 by ORT Israel and World ORT organizations. In 1992 an academic college, financed by the government,  started operating on the campus grounds. The college  also offers student exchange programs through partnerships with universities abroad.

References

See also
List of universities and colleges in Israel
Education in Israel

Colleges in Israel
Education in Israel